Squilchuck State Park is a public recreation area located below Mission Ridge  south of Wenatchee in Chelan County, Washington. The  state park offers hiking, mountain biking and cross-country ski trails, group camping, birdwatching, and wildlife viewing. The park's Squilchuck Lodge is used for group gatherings.

References

External links
Squilchuck State Park Washington State Parks and Recreation Commission 
Squilchuck State Park Map Washington State Parks and Recreation Commission

State parks of Washington (state)
Parks in Chelan County, Washington
Protected areas established in 1952